Lindsay Anne Bovaird (born February 28, 1992) is a Canadian actress best known for voicing the title character in the animated TV series Caillou, after the previous voice actress Jaclyn Linetsky died in a car crash. She also voiced Elsa in Creepschool, Zaza in Dragon Hunters, Denim Farqueson in The Tournament, and Juju in Potatoes and Dragons.

Filmography

References

External links

1992 births
Actresses from Montreal
Anglophone Quebec people
Canadian child actresses
Canadian voice actresses
Living people